is a Japanese music show. It is broadcast by Fuji Television. The shows started in 1964 and it is the longest-running Japanese music show and is sponsored by Shionogi.

Current airtime 18:00 -18:30 (JST) every Saturday.

Hosts 
Fubuki Koshiji (1964)
Sachiko Hidari (1965)
Yōko Minamida & Hiroyuki Nagato (1965-1981)
Tomoko Hoshino (1982-1988)
Yuko Kotegawa (1988-1995)
Anju Suzuki (1995–2016)
Toshiaki Megumi (2001–2016)
Yukie Nakama & Shin'ichi Karube (2016–Present)

Foreign Performers 
 Amy Holland
 ABBA
 Ariana Grande
 Leona Lewis
 Mariah Carey
 Roxette
 Shania Twain
 TVXQ
 Halcali
 Destiny's Child
 Taylor Swift
 Jejung & Yuchun
 Eric Carmen
 Olivia Newton-John
 Spice Girls
 Teresa Teng
 Madonna
 Pentatonix
 IZ*ONE
 Onew

See also 
FNS Music Festival
Hey! Hey! Hey! Music Champ

References

External links 
Fuji Television

1964 Japanese television series debuts
1960s Japanese television series
1970s Japanese television series
1980s Japanese television series
1990s Japanese television series
2000s Japanese television series
2010s Japanese television series
2020s Japanese television series
Japanese music television series
Fuji TV original programming